Sharon Downtown Historic District is a national historic district located at Sharon, York County, South Carolina. It encompasses nine contributing buildings in the central business district of Sharon. The buildings are predominantly masonry commercial buildings built between 1908 and 1944. The buildings are the First National Bank of Sharon, Shannon and Plexico Buildings, Love and Kennedy Buildings, Hope Building and Sims Hood Drugstore, and John S. Rainey Cotton Gin, Seedhouse and Office.

It was added to the National Register of Historic Places in 2001.

References

Historic districts on the National Register of Historic Places in South Carolina
Commercial buildings on the National Register of Historic Places in South Carolina
Buildings and structures in York County, South Carolina
National Register of Historic Places in York County, South Carolina